The 1898 Pembrokeshire by-election was a parliamentary by-election held for the House of Commons constituency of Pembrokeshire  in South West Wales on 15 February 1898.

Vacancy
The by-election was caused by the appointment as Attorney general of the Bahamas of the sitting Liberal MP, William Rees-Davies.

Candidates
Two candidates nominated. 

The Liberal Party nominated John Philipps, a barrister.

The Conservative Party nominated the 4th Earl Cawdor, Hugh F V Campbell.

References

1898 elections in the United Kingdom
Elections in Pembrokeshire
1893 in Wales
1890s elections in Wales
19th century in Pembrokeshire
February 1898 events